Private First Class Louis Edward Willett (June 19, 1945 – February 15, 1967) was a soldier in the United States Army who received the Medal of Honor posthumously for his actions during the Vietnam War as a member of Company C, 1st Battalion, 12th Infantry, 4th Infantry Division. Born in Brooklyn, New York, and raised in Richmond Hill, New York of Irish and French Canadian extraction, Willett was a graduate of Archbishop Molloy High School in Queens, New York, withdrew from SUNY Maritime College at Fort Schuyler, Bronx, New York in 1965, was drafted while working as a lineman for the telephone company.

Medal of Honor citation
His Medal of Honor citation reads:

For conspicuous gallantry and intrepidity at the risk of his life above and beyond the call of duty. PFC Willett distinguished himself while serving as a rifleman in Company C, during combat operations. His squad was conducting a security sweep when it made contact with a large enemy force. The squad was immediately engaged with a heavy volume of automatic weapons fire and pinned to the ground. Despite the deadly fusillade, PFC Willett rose to his feet firing rapid bursts from his weapon and moved to a position from which he placed highly effective fire on the enemy. His action allowed the remainder of his squad to begin to withdraw from the superior enemy force toward the company perimeter. PFC Willett covered the squad's withdrawal, but his position drew heavy enemy machinegun fire, and he received multiple wounds enabling the enemy again to pin down the remainder of the squad. PFC Willett struggled to an upright position, and, disregarding his painful wounds, he again engaged the enemy with his rifle to allow his squad to continue its movement and to evacuate several of his comrades who were by now wounded. Moving from position to position, he engaged the enemy at close range until he was mortally wounded. By his unselfish acts of bravery, PFC Willett insured the withdrawal of his comrades to the company position, saving their lives at the cost of his life. PFC Willett's valorous actions were in keeping with the highest traditions of the U.S. Army and reflect great credit upon himself and the Armed Forces of his country.

See also
List of Medal of Honor recipients
List of Medal of Honor recipients for the Vietnam War

References

1945 births
1967 deaths
United States Army Medal of Honor recipients
United States Army soldiers
Burials at St. John's Cemetery (Queens)
American military personnel killed in the Vietnam War
Archbishop Molloy High School alumni
Vietnam War recipients of the Medal of Honor
United States Army personnel of the Vietnam War
State University of New York Maritime College alumni